The Blues Message is an album by saxophonist Curtis Amy and organist Paul Bryant recorded in 1960 for the Pacific Jazz label.

Reception

AllMusic rated the album with 3 stars.

Track listing
All compositions by Curtis Amy, except as indicated
 "Searchin'" (Paul Bryant) - 8:44
 "Goin' Down, Catch Me a Woman" - 9:22
 "The Blues Message" - 8:44
 "Come Rain or Come Shine" (Harold Arlen, Johnny Mercer) - 4:54
 "This Is the Blues" - 8:38

Personnel 
Curtis Amy - tenor saxophone
Paul Bryant - organ
Roy Brewster - valve trombone 
Clarence Jones - bass
Jimmy Miller - drums

References 

1960 albums
Pacific Jazz Records albums
Curtis Amy albums